Pino or Piño may refer to:

People

Surname
 Danny Pino (born 1974), American actor
 Domenico Pino (1760–1826), Italian general of the Napoleonic Wars
 Fernando Solanas (born 1936), aka "Pino" Solanas, Argentine filmmaker
 Frank J. Pino (1909–2007), New York politician and judge
 Jose Moya del Pino (1891–1969), Spanish-born American painter, muralist and educator
 Juan Pablo Pino (born 1987), Colombian football player
 Nicolas Pino (1819–1896), American Civil War officer

Given name
 Pino Caballero Gil (born 1968) is a Spanish computer scientist
 Pino Cabras (born 1968), Italian politician
 Pino Daeni (1939–2010), Italian artist
 Pino Daniele (1955–2015), Italian musician
 Pino Palladino (born 1957), Welsh-Italian musician
 Pino Presti (born 1943), Italian musician

Places
 Pino, California, former name of Loomis
 Pino, Haute-Corse, a town in France
 Pino d'Asti, a municipality in the Province of Asti, Italy
 Pino sulla Sponda del Lago Maggiore, a village and municipality in the Province of Varese, Italy
 Pino Torinese, a municipality in the Metropolitan City of Turin in the Italian region Piedmont

Other
 PINO, an open humanoid robot platform
 Pino (doll), a character in Namco's 1986 arcade game, Toy Pop
 Nissan Pino, a kei car produced by Nissan from 2007–2010
 A bird muppet on the Dutch children's television series Sesamstraat
 Phthalimido-N-oxyl, a radical derived from N-Hydroxyphthalimide

See also
 El Pinar (disambiguation)
 El Pino (disambiguation)
 Pinho, a surname
 Pinos (disambiguation)
 Pinot (disambiguation)